Greatest Hits Vol. III is the third greatest hits package released by the American country music band Alabama. The album was released by RCA Records in 1994, and has since been certified double platinum for sales of 2 million units by the Recording Industry Association of America .

Alabama had continued success through the first half of the 1990s, enabling the Fort Payne, Alabama-based band to issue their third album of greatest hits. Included in this 11-track album are eight previous No. 1 hits, including the original single version of "Tennessee River" (an extended live version was included on their first Greatest Hits collection). A holiday/Christian-themed fan favorite, "Angels Among Us", is also included.

Both of the album's new tracks were released as singles: "We Can't Love Like This Anymore" (late 1994) and "Give Me One More Shot" (early 1995). Both songs reached the Top 10 of Billboard magazines Hot Country Singles & Tracks chart.

Track listing

Personnel on Tracks 1 & 2AlabamaJeff Cook – background vocals
Teddy Gentry – bass guitar, background vocals
Randy Owen – lead vocals

Alabama's drummer, Mark Herndon, does not play on the new tracks.Additional musicians'
Dann Huff – electric guitar
Brent Mason – electric guitar
Steve Nathan – piano, keyboards
Don Potter – acoustic guitar
Milton Sledge – drums
Biff Watson – acoustic guitar

Charts

Weekly charts

Year-end charts

Certifications

References

1994 greatest hits albums
Alabama (band) compilation albums
RCA Records compilation albums